Jackson Wells  (born 21 April 1998) is a New Zealand freestyle skier who competes internationally. He represented New Zealand in slopestyle at the 2018 Winter Olympics in PyeongChang.

References

1998 births
Living people
New Zealand male freestyle skiers 
Olympic freestyle skiers of New Zealand
Freestyle skiers at the 2018 Winter Olympics 
Freestyle skiers at the 2016 Winter Youth Olympics